Ringleben is the name of two towns in the state of Thuringia, Germany:

Ringleben, Sömmerda
Ringleben, Kyffhäuserkreis